The list of ship launches in 1891 includes a chronological list of some ships launched in 1891.


References

Sources

1891
 
1891 in transport